Jasur Baykuziyev is an Uzbekistani taekwondo practitioner. In 2014, he won the gold medal in the men's 87 kg event at the 2014 Asian Games held in Incheon, South Korea. In 2015, he won the silver medal in the men's middleweight event at the 2015 World Taekwondo Championships held in Chelyabinsk, Russia.

He competed in the men's 80 kg event at the 2010 Asian Games in Guangzhou, China without winning a medal. In 2016, he won one of the bronze medals in the men's −87 kg event at the 2016 Asian Taekwondo Championships in Pasay, Philippines.

References

External links 
 

Living people
Year of birth missing (living people)
Place of birth missing (living people)
Uzbekistani male taekwondo practitioners
Asian Games gold medalists for Uzbekistan
Asian Games medalists in taekwondo
Taekwondo practitioners at the 2010 Asian Games
Taekwondo practitioners at the 2014 Asian Games
Medalists at the 2014 Asian Games
World Taekwondo Championships medalists
Asian Taekwondo Championships medalists
20th-century Uzbekistani people
21st-century Uzbekistani people